A government circular is a written statement of government policy. It will often provide information, guidance, rules, and/or background information on legislative or procedural matters.

See also
List of circulars

References
Circulars | The White House

Government statements
Government publications